The Drude model of electrical conduction was proposed in 1900 by Paul Drude to explain the transport properties of electrons in materials (especially metals). Basically, Ohm's law was well established and stated that the current J and voltage V driving the current are related to the resistance R of the material. The inverse of the resistance is known as the conductance. When we consider a metal of unit length and unit cross sectional area, the conductance is known as the conductivity, which is the inverse of resistivity. The Drude model attempts to explain the resistivity of a conductor in terms of the scattering of electrons (the carriers of electricity) by the relatively immobile ions in the metal that act like obstructions to the flow of electrons.

The model, which is an application of kinetic theory, assumes that the microscopic behaviour of electrons in a solid may be treated classically and behaves much like a pinball machine, with a sea of constantly jittering electrons bouncing and re-bouncing off heavier, relatively immobile positive ions.

The two most significant results of the Drude model are an electronic equation of motion,

and a linear relationship between current density  and electric field ,

The latter expression is particularly important because it explains in semi-quantitative terms why Ohm's law, one of the most ubiquitous relationships in all of electromagnetism, should hold.

The model was extended in 1905 by Hendrik Antoon Lorentz (and hence is also known as the Drude–Lorentz model) to give the relation between the thermal conductivity and the electric conductivity of metals (see Lorenz number), and is a classical model. Later it was supplemented with the results of quantum theory in 1933 by Arnold Sommerfeld and Hans Bethe, leading to the Drude–Sommerfeld model.

History 

German physicist Paul Drude proposed his model in 1900 when it was not clear whether atoms existed, and it was not clear what atoms were on a microscopic scale. The first direct proof of atoms through the computation of the Avogadro number from a microscopic model is due to Albert Einstein, the first modern model of atom structure dates to 1904 and the Rutherford model to 1909.
Drude starts from the discovery of electrons in 1897 by J.J. Thomson and assumes as a simplistic model of solids that the bulk of the solid is composed of positively charged scattering centers, and a sea of electrons submerge those scattering centers to make the total solid neutral from a charge perspective.

In modern terms this is reflected in the valence electron model where the sea of electrons is composed of the valence electrons only, and not the full set of electrons available in the solid, and the scattering centers are the inner shells of tightly bound electrons to the nucleus. The scattering centers had a positive charge equivalent to the valence number of the atoms.
This similarity added to some computation errors in the Drude paper, ended up providing a reasonable qualitative theory of solids capable of making good predictions in certain cases and giving completely wrong results in others. 
Whenever people tried to give more substance and detail to the nature of the scattering centers, and the mechanics of scattering, and the meaning of the length of scattering, all these attempts ended in failures.

The scattering lengths computed in the Drude model, are of the order of 10 to 100 inter-atomic distances, and also these could not be given proper microscopic explanations.

Drude scattering is not electron-electron scattering which is only a secondary phenomenon in the modern theory, neither nuclear scattering given electrons can be at most be absorbed by nuclei. The model remains a bit mute on the microscopic mechanisms, in modern terms this is what is now called the "primary scattering mechanism" where the underlying phenomenon can be different case per case.

The model gives better predictions for metals, especially in regards to conductivity, and sometimes is called Drude theory of metals. This is because metals have essentially a better approximation to the free electron model, i.e. metals do not have complex band structures, electrons behave essentially as free particles and where, in the case of metals, the effective number of de-localized electrons is essentially the same as the valence number.

The same Drude theory, despite inconsistencies which baffled most physicists of the period, was the major one accepted to explain solids until the introduction in 1927 of the Drude–Sommerfeld model.

A few more hints of the correct ingredients of a modern theory of solids was given by  the following:
 The Einstein solid model and the Debye model, suggesting that the quantum behaviour of exchanging energy in integral units or quanta was an essential component in the full theory especially with regard to specific heats, where the Drude theory failed.
 In some cases, namely in the Hall effect, the theory was making correct predictions if instead of using a negative charge for the electrons a positive one was used. This is now interpreted as holes (i.e. quasi-particles that behave as positive charge carriers) but at the time of Drude it was rather obscure why this was the case.

Drude used Maxwell–Boltzmann statistics for the gas of electrons and for deriving the model, which was the only one available at that time. By replacing the statistics with the correct Fermi Dirac statistics, Sommerfeld significantly improved the predictions of the model, although still having a semi-classical theory that could not predict all results of the modern quantum theory of solids.

Nowadays Drude and Sommerfeld models are still significant to understanding the qualitative behaviour of solids and to get a first qualitative understanding of a specific experimental setup. This is a generic method in solid state physics, where it is typical to incrementally increase the complexity of the models to give more and more accurate predictions. It is less common to use a full-blown quantum field theory from first principles, given the complexities due to the huge numbers of particles and interactions and the little added value of the extra mathematics involved (considering the incremental gain in numerical precision of the predictions).

Assumptions 
Drude used the kinetic theory of gases applied to the gas of electrons moving on a fixed background of "ions"; this is in contrast with the usual way of applying the theory of gases as a neutral diluted gas with no background. The number density of the electron gas was assumed to be 

where Z is the effective number of de-localized electrons per ion, for which Drude used the valence number, A is the atomic mass per mole,  is the mass density (mass per unit volume) of the "ions", and N is the Avogadro constant.
Considering the average volume available per electron as a sphere:

The quantity  is a parameter that describes the electron density and is often of the order of 2 or 3 times the Bohr radius, for alkali metals it ranges from 3 to 6 and some metal compounds it can go up to 10.
The densities are of the order of 100 times of a typical classical gas.

The core assumptions made in the Drude model are the following:
 Drude applied the kinetic theory of a dilute gas, despite the high densities, therefore ignoring electron–electron and electron–ion interactions aside from collisions.
 The Drude model considers the metal to be formed of a collection of positively charged ions from which a number of "free electrons" were detached. These may be thought to be the valence electrons of the atoms that have become delocalized due to the electric field of the other atoms.
 The Drude model neglects long-range interaction between the electron and the ions or between the electrons; this is called the independent electron approximation.
 The electrons move in straight lines between one collision and another; this is called free electron approximation.
 The only interaction of a free electron with its environment was treated as being collisions with the impenetrable ions core.
The nature of the collision partner of the electron does not matter for the calculations and conclusions of the Drude model.
 After a collision event, the distribution of the velocity and direction of an electron is determined by only the local temperature and is independent of the velocity of the electron before the collision event. The electron is considered to be immediately at equilibrium with the local temperature after a collision.

Removing or improving upon each of these assumptions gives more refined models, that can more accurately describe different solids:
 Improving the hypothesis of the Maxwell–Boltzmann statistics with the Fermi–Dirac statistics leads to the Drude–Sommerfeld model.
 Improving the hypothesis of the Maxwell–Boltzmann statistics with the Bose–Einstein statistics leads to considerations about the specific heat of integer spin atoms and to the Bose–Einstein condensate.
 A valence band electron in a semiconductor is still essentially a free electron in a delimited energy range (i.e. only a "rare" high energy collision that implies a change of band would behave differently); the independent electron approximation is essentially still valid (i.e. no electron–electron scattering), where instead the hypothesis about the localization of the scattering events is dropped (in layman terms the electron is and scatters all over the place).

Mathematical treatment

DC field 
The simplest analysis of the Drude model assumes that electric field  is both uniform and constant, and that the thermal velocity of electrons is sufficiently high such that they accumulate only an infinitesimal amount of momentum  between collisions, which occur on average every  seconds.

Then an electron isolated at time  will on average have been travelling for time  since its last collision, and consequently will have accumulated momentum

During its last collision, this electron will have been just as likely to have bounced forward as backward, so all prior contributions to the electron's momentum may be ignored, resulting in the expression

Substituting the relations

results in the formulation of Ohm's law mentioned above:

Time-varying analysis 

The dynamics may also be described by introducing an effective drag force. At time  the electron's momentum will be:

where  can be interpreted as generic force (e.g. Lorentz Force) on the carrier or more specifically on the electron.  is the momentum of the carrier with random direction after the collision (i.e. with a momentum ) and with absolute kinetic energy 

With a bit of algebra and dropping terms of order , this results in the generic differential equation

The second term is actually an extra drag force or damping term due to the Drude effects.

Constant electric field 
At time  the average electron's momentum will be

and then

where  denotes average momentum and  the charge of the electrons. This, which is an inhomogeneous differential equation, may be solved to obtain the general solution of

The steady state solution, is then

As above, average momentum may be related to average velocity and this in turn may be related to current density,

and the material can be shown to satisfy Ohm's law  with a DC-conductivity :

AC field 

The Drude model can also predict the current as a response to a time-dependent electric field with an angular frequency . The complex conductivity is

Here it is assumed that:

The imaginary part indicates that the current lags behind the electrical field. This happens because the electrons need roughly a time  to accelerate in response to a change in the electrical field. Here the Drude model is applied to electrons; it can be applied both to electrons and holes; i.e., positive charge carriers in semiconductors.

If a sinusoidally varying electric field with frequency  is applied to the solid, the negatively charged electrons behave as a plasma that tends to move a distance x apart from the positively charged background. As a result, the sample is polarized and there will be an excess charge at the opposite surfaces of the sample.

The dielectric constant of the sample  is expressed as

The polarization density is written as

and the polarization density with n electron density is

After a little algebra the relation between polarization density and electric field can be expressed as

The frequency dependent dielectric function of the solid is

At a resonance frequency , called the plasma frequency, the dielectric function changes sign from negative to positive and real part of the dielectric function drops to zero.

The plasma frequency represents a plasma oscillation resonance or plasmon. The plasma frequency can be employed as a direct measure of the square root of the density of valence electrons in a solid. Observed values are in reasonable agreement with this theoretical prediction for a large number of materials. Below the plasma frequency, the dielectric function is negative and the field cannot penetrate the sample. Light with angular frequency below the plasma frequency will be totally reflected. Above the plasma frequency the light waves can penetrate the sample, a typical example are alkaline metals that becomes transparent in the range of ultraviolet radiation.

Thermal conductivity of metals 
One great success of the Drude model is the explanation of the Wiedemann-Franz law.  This was due to a fortuitous cancellation of errors in Drude's original calculation.  Drude predicted the value of the Lorenz number: 

Thermopower 
A generic temperature gradient when switched on in a thin bar will trigger a current of electrons towards the lower temperature side, given the experiments are done in an open circuit manner this current will accumulate on that side generating an electric field countering the electric current. This field is called thermoelectric field:

and Q is called thermopower. The estimates by Drude are a factor of 100 low given the direct dependency with the specific heat.

where the typical thermopowers at room temperature are 100 times smaller of the order of micro-volts.

Drude response in real materials 
The characteristic behavior of a Drude metal in the time or frequency domain, i.e. exponential relaxation with time constant  or the frequency dependence for  stated above, is called Drude response. In a conventional, simple, real metal (e.g. sodium, silver, or gold at room temperature) such behavior is not found experimentally, because the characteristic frequency  is in the infrared frequency range, where other features that are not considered in the Drude model (such as band structure) play an important role. These are materials where the relaxation rate  is at much lower frequencies. This is the case for certain doped semiconductor single crystals, high-mobility two-dimensional electron gases, and heavy-fermion metals.

Accuracy of the model 
Historically, the Drude formula was first derived in a limited way, namely by assuming that the charge carriers form a classical ideal gas. Arnold Sommerfeld considered quantum theory and extended the theory to the free electron model, where the carriers follow Fermi–Dirac distribution. The conductivity predicted is the same as in the Drude model because it does not depend on the form of the electronic speed distribution.

The Drude model provides a very good explanation of DC and AC conductivity in metals, the Hall effect, and the magnetoresistance in metals near room temperature. The model also explains partly the Wiedemann–Franz law of 1853. However, it greatly overestimates the electronic heat capacities of metals. 
In reality, metals and insulators have roughly the same heat capacity at room temperature.

The model can also be applied to positive (hole) charge carriers.

In his original paper, Drude made an error, estimating the Lorenz number of Wiedemann–Franz law to be twice what it classically should have been, thus making it seem in agreement with the experimental value of the specific heat. This number is about 100 times smaller than the classical prediction but this factor cancels out with the mean electronic speed that is about 100 times bigger than Drude's calculation.

See also
Free electron model
Arnold Sommerfeld
Electrical conductivity

Citations

References

General

External links

Electric current
Electric and magnetic fields in matter